Émilie Simon is the debut album of Émilie Simon. The album was a commercial and critical success, winning a Victoire de la musique in 2004 for Best Electronic Album. Critics called her "France's answer to Iceland's alternative pop princess Björk." Simon wrote, composed and produced the bulk of the album by herself. The album was re-issued in December 2003, months after its release.

Track listing

Charts

References

2003 debut albums
Émilie Simon albums
Barclay (record label) albums
Universal Music Group albums